Dhamrai Jagannath Roth is a chariot temple, a Roth, dedicated to the Hindu God Jagannath located in Dhamrai, Bangladesh. The annual Jagannath Roth Jatra is a famous Hindu festival attracting thousands of people. The Roth Jatra in Dhamrai is one of the most important events for the Hindu community of Bangladesh. Sri Jagannath (Lord of the World) is believed by the Hindus to be an incarnation of Lord  Vishnu, one among the Holy Hindu Trinity of Gods (Brahma the creator, Vishnu the preserver, and Shiva the destroyer). Lord Jagannath is also believed to be a deity form of Lord Krishna. 

For the thousands of Hindu devotees, it is considered a pious deed and the huge processions accompanying the chariots play devotional songs with drums, tambourines, and trumpets. A glimpse of Lord Jagannath on the chariot is considered to be very auspicious and saints, poets and scriptures have repeatedly glorified the sanctity of this special festival. The sanctity of the festival is such that even a touch of the chariot or even the ropes with which these are pulled is considered enough to confer the results of several pious deeds or penance for ages.

History

From the unpublished documents and records it seems that the Dhamrai Roth is said to be about 400 years old. It is learned from those records that from Bangla Year 1079 (corresponding to 1672 in the Gregorian calendar) to 1204 (1697 AD) the Roth that was in existence was made with bamboos. It is, however, not known how this Bamboo made Roth was replaced by the one made of wood. The unpublished sources mention that in between BS 1204 to BS 1340 the Jamindars (Feudal Landlords) of Baliati (now located in Saturia Upazila) had four ‘Roth’s made and they provided all the expenses for its construction.

The last one took a period of one year to build and the carpenters of Dhamrai, Kaliakoir, Saturia, and Singair jointly worked to make a Roth which was 60 feet in height and 45 feet wide which was completed in 1340 BS, corresponding to 1933 AD. The newly constructed Roth was 3-storied. Each of the first and second floors had four chambers at the four corners and one chamber on the top floor. These chambers or rooms were called ‘Noborotno’s.  The Roth had 32 giant wooden wheels and was adorned with two wooden horses in front as well as carvings and paintings of Hindu deities. Thick ropes made with about 1000 kilograms of jute fiber were used to pull the Roth along. As it was being pulled people lining up the street and on roof-tops would shower bananas and sugar on the Roth amidst cheers and chanting.

After the abolition of ‘jamindari’ system in 1950, Ray Bahadur Ranada Prosad Shaha of Mirzapur, Tangail extended extensive support and financial assistance for the upkeep, maintenance of the Roth, and for hosting of the event with pomp and grandeur. This support continued until 1970 under the auspices of Kumudini Welfare Trust which was formed by Mr. R. P. Saha.

The War of Liberation began in 1971 and this majestic historical Roth was burnt down by the Pakistan Army. The chief patron, Mr. R.P. Saha, was himself abducted and killed by the Army as an aftermath of ethnic cleansing which the Pakistan Army unleashed on Bangladesh Hindus. After Bangladesh gained independence, in order to carry on the tradition of yearly Roth festival, a makeshift Roth was built with bamboos with the assistance of the daughter of Mr. Saha, Mrs. Joya Pati, Justice Debesh Bhattacharya, Gouro Gopal Saha and Thakur Gopal Banik.

Current Roth (Chariot)
In the year 2006 Mrs. Bina Sikri, the then Indian High Commissioner to Bangladesh pledged to provide financial assistance in building a new Roth. Consequently, a 3-storied Roth was built in 2010. The new Roth is 27 feet long and of the same width; it has 15 wheels and is adorned with statues of different gods and goddesses. A Roth Committee of local people of Dhamrai with Mr. Rajib Saha, the son of Mr. R.P. Saha, as the chief Patron, have been organizing and holding this yearly gala event.

The journey of the Roth begins from the Madhabbari Temple to the Gope Nagar Temple, regarded to be the In-Laws house, a distance of about half a kilometer away. During the festival, devotees help pull the Roth with ropes and brought to the Gope Nagar temple. After one week the Chariot is pulled back to Madhab Mandir again which is termed as “Ulto Roth” (উলটো রথ) - Return Journey.

Roth festival
The Roth festival, Roth Mela (রথ মেলা), is a month long, and connected with the Bengali calendar. It takes place during the Bengali month of  Ashadh (আষাঢ়). The date is fixed on the second quarter of the moon. Usually, the time is during June, but sometimes it also takes place in July. The celebrations are held along the main road of Dhamrai.

In addition to various stalls set up for sale of varieties of products, circus and puppet shows also come to provide entertainment to people from all walks of life and across religious faiths.

References 

Hindu temples in Dhaka Division
16th-century Hindu temples
Temples dedicated to Jagannath